Demetrida aiyura is a species of ground beetle in Lebiinae subfamily. It was described by Darlington in 1991 and is endemic to New Guinea.

Reference

Beetles described in 1971
Beetles of Papua New Guinea
aiyura